Kevin Meredith (born 1978), also known as Lomokev, is a British photographer and writer, living in Brighton. He is known for his use of the Lomo LC-A camera and his lomographic style.

Meredith has produced three books on photography: Hot Shots (2008), 52 Photographic Projects (2010, titled Photo Op in the USA) and Toy Cameras, Creative Photos (2011, titled Fantastic Plastic Cameras in the USA).

Life and work
Meredith grew up in Folkestone, England and began photographing at age 16. He started using a Lomo LC-A in 1998 and gained notoriety for his use of this camera, often in Brighton, and for his use of social media as a tool to promote his photography, specifically Flickr.

His portrait montages appeared in the monthly Brighton Source magazine for four years. He teaches photography courses using the Lomo LC-A, has given talks at venues internationally and works as a commercial photographer. He lives in Brighton.

Publications

Publications by Meredith
Hot Shots. Brighton & Hove: Rotovision, 2008. . UK edition.
Hot Shots. San Francisco, CA: Chronicle, 2009. . US edition.
How to Take Better Photos. Revised edition. Brighton and Hove: Rotovision, 2018. .
52 Photographic Projects
Brighton and Hove: Rotovision, 2010. . UK edition.
Photo Op: 52 Inspirational Projects for the Adventurous Image Maker. Waltham, MA: Focal, 2010. . US edition.
Toy Cameras, Creative Photos: High-end Results from 40 Plastic Cameras.
Brighton & Hove: Rotovision, 2011. . UK edition.
Fantastic Plastic Cameras: Tips and Tricks for 40 Toy Cameras. San Francisco, CA: Chronicle, 2011. . US edition.
I Dare the Wave, a Life to Save. Brighton and Hove: Miniclick, 2014. Edition of 50 copies. Photographs of Brighton Swimming Club. 1 of 5 publications collectively titled The Miniclick Press Volume 1 / Brighton. The other publications are by Ondra Loup, Kristina Sälgvik, Jack Latham and Jean-Luc Brouard.

Publications with contributions by Meredith
Spirit of Friendship. By Colin Edward Offland. Manchester: Chief, 2002. .
Don't Think Just Shoot. London: Booth-Clibborn, 2007. .
Joachim Schmid Is Martin Parr · Martin Parr Is Joachim Schmid. Self-published by Joachim Schmid, 2009.
Archives / Memories: Brighton Swimming Club: 1860–2013. Brighton Swimming Club, 2013. Edited by Lindy Dunlop.
Toy Tokyo. Kingyo, 2014. Edited by Manami Okazaki. .

Exhibitions

Solo exhibitions
The Daily Swim, The Eagle, Brighton, 2009
The Old Market, Hove, 2011

Group exhibitions
Austen room, British Airways i360, Brighton. A permanent exhibition from April 2017 with photographs by Meredith, Gary Eastwood, and Paul Raftery.

Awards
Second place, the Lomolympics 2000, Tokyo, 2000
Third place, Lomographic World Congress, Vienna, 2002

Notes

References

External links
 
Flickr Blog – 5 Questions for Kevin Meredith
Google Tech Talk – Hobbyist to Flickr Celeb: Building a Career with Social Networking (Kevin Meredith aka lomokev)
Interview by Lou Noble in The Photographic Journal

1978 births
Living people
Photographers from Sussex
People from Brighton
Street fashion
21st-century British photographers
People from Folkestone